Beckville Independent School District is a public school district based in Beckville, Texas (USA).  Beckville ISD also serves a small portion of the nearby city of Tatum.

Finances
As of the 2010–2011 school year, the appraised valuation of property in the district was $733,790,000. The maintenance tax rate was $0.098 and the bond tax rate was $0.008 per $100 of appraised valuation.

Academic achievement
In 2011, the school district was rated "academically acceptable" by the Texas Education Agency.

Schools
In the 2011–2012 school year, the district had two campuses.
Beckville Junior/Senior High (Grades 6-12)
Beckville Sunset Elementary (Grades PK-5)

See also

List of school districts in Texas

References

External links

School districts in Panola County, Texas